Limestone Creek is a suburb in the Rockhampton Region, Queensland, Australia.

Road infrastructure
The Rockhampton-Yeppoon Road (as Yeppoon Road) runs through from west to east.

References 

Suburbs of Rockhampton Region